Fathabad (also Romanized as Fatḩābād; also known as Fatḩābād-e Hūmeh, Fat-h Abad Hoomeh, Howmeh, and Hūmeh) is a village in Vahdat Rural District, in the Central District of Zarand County, Kerman Province, Iran. At the 2006 census, its population was 853, in 202 families.

References 

Populated places in Zarand County